Byrchall High School is a secondary school and specialist mathematics and computing school with academy status, in the Ashton-in-Makerfield area of the Metropolitan Borough of Wigan, Greater Manchester.

Admissions
It has a mixed intake of both boys and girls aged 11–16. The current pupil population is approximately 1,200. The current headteacher is Alan Birchall. Byrchall High School is one of three secondary schools in Ashton, the other two being St Edmund Arrowsmith Catholic High School, next to Byrchall High School, and Cansfield High School.

The school is situated between the A49 and the M6 on the southern edge of the Wigan borough, neighbouring St Helens.

History

Grammar school
The school was founded in 1588 as Ashton Grammar School by Robert Byrchall on land donated by wealthy local land owner William Gerrard. The original building in Seneley Green is now Garswood Library. Through the school, Ashton-in-Makerfield Grammar School Old Boys F.C. (now known as Ashtonians AFC) entered the Lancashire Amateur Football League in 1951.

In 1960, Lancashire Education Committee proposed to amalgamate the school with Upholland Grammar School when the school had around 450 pupils. The school was administered by Wigan Metropolitan Borough  Council from April 1974. By 1973 the school had 700 pupils and 800 by 1975.

Comprehensive
It became a comprehensive school in 1978.

Academy
The school became an academy on 1 October 2012.

Academic performance
The school's pupils generally obtain above-average GCSE results; one of the few schools in Wigan LEA to achieve this which is not a faith school.

Alumni

Ashton-in-Makerfield Grammar School
 Sir George Bishop CB OBE, Chairman from 1972-79 of Booker-McConnell, President from 1957-58 of the International Sugar Council, President from 1983-87 of the Royal Geographical Society
 Prof Rodney Robert Porter FRS, biochemist, won the 1972 Nobel Prize in Physiology or Medicine for discovering the structure of antibodies, Whitley Professor of Biochemistry from 1967-85 at the University of Oxford
 Sir John Randall FRS, physicist who invented the cavity magnetron, currently found in microwave ovens

Byrchall High School

 Jane Bruton, Chairman in 2007 of the British Society of Magazine Editors, and Editor from 2005-15 of Grazia and from 2001-01 of Eve
Lemn Sissay, BAFTA-nominated writer and broadcaster

References
 OFSTED Report

External links
 School Website
 EduBase

Educational institutions established in the 1580s
Secondary schools in the Metropolitan Borough of Wigan
Academies in the Metropolitan Borough of Wigan
1588 establishments in England
Ashton-in-Makerfield